Francis Adamson McCormack (25 September 1924 – 6 April 2011) was a Scottish footballer who played as a centre half in the Football League.

External links

References

1924 births
2011 deaths
Scottish footballers
Footballers from Glasgow
Association football central defenders
Clyde F.C. players
Oldham Athletic A.F.C. players
Greenock Morton F.C. players
English Football League players
Scottish Football League players
Parkhead F.C. players